Momo Kids is a Canadian Category B-exempt Mandarin language specialty channel owned by Ethnic Channels Group. It is a licensed version of the Taiwanese children's channel of the same name and broadcasts its original content.

References

External links
 Momo Kids Canada
 Momo Kids 

Children's television networks in Canada
Digital cable television networks in Canada
Mandarin-language television stations
Chinese-language mass media in Canada
Chinese-language television
Multicultural and ethnic television in Canada